Leland Devon Melvin (born February 15, 1964) is an American engineer and a retired NASA astronaut. He served on board the Space Shuttle Atlantis as a mission specialist on STS-122, and as mission specialist 1 on STS-129.  Melvin was named the NASA Associate Administrator for Education in October 2010.

Biography

Melvin attended Heritage High School and then went on to the University of Richmond on a football scholarship, where he received a bachelor's degree in chemistry. In 1989, he received a Master of Science degree in Materials Science Engineering from the University of Virginia.

His parents, Deems and Grace, reside in Lynchburg, Virginia and Melvin's recreational interests include photography, piano, reading, music, cycling, tennis, and snowboarding.

Melvin appeared as an elimination challenge guest judge in the 12th episode of Top Chef (season 7); with his dogs in the seventh season of The Dog Whisperer and the second season of the Netflix series Dogs; and was the host of Child Genius (season 1 and 2).

Football career
Melvin was a wide receiver on the University of Richmond football team from 1982 to 1985. Melvin is first on the University of Richmond's career lists with 198 receptions for 2,669yards, and fourth on Richmond's career touchdown receptions list with 16. He was an AP honorable mention All-America selection in 1984 and 1985 and second-team Apple Academic All-America in 1985.

A team captain during his senior season, Melvin had his best year in 1985, with 65 catches for 956yards and eight touchdowns. His top game was in 1984 against James Madison University, when he had 10 catches for 208yards and one touchdown.

Melvin caught at least one pass in every game he played as a Richmond Spider (39).

He was in the University of Richmond Athletic Hall of Fame Inductee Class of 1996–97 and selected for the All-UR Stadium Team in 2009, which commemorates the greatest Spiders to have played at the stadium in its 81-year history.

Melvin was chosen by the Detroit Lions in the 11th round of the 1986 NFL Draft as a wide receiver. During training camp, he pulled a hamstring and was released from the team in late August. In October, he was added to the Canadian Football League's Toronto Argonauts' practice roster.

He reported to the Dallas Cowboys the following spring but pulled a hamstring a second time, officially ending his professional football career.

NASA career
Melvin began working in Nondestructive Evaluation Sciences Branch at NASA Langley Research Center in 1989. His responsibilities included using optical fiber sensors to measure strain, temperature, and chemical damage in both composite and metallic structures. In 1994, he was selected to lead the Vehicle Health Monitoring team for the cooperative NASA/ Lockheed Martin X-33 Reusable Launch Vehicle program. In 1996, he co-designed and monitored construction of an optical nondestructive evaluation facility capable of producing in-line fiber optic sensors.

Selected as an astronaut in June 1998, Melvin reported for training in August 1998. He has since been assigned to the Astronaut Office Space Station Operations Branch, and the Education Department at NASA Headquarters, Washington, D.C. As co-manager of NASA's Educator Astronaut Program, Melvin has traveled across the country, discussing space exploration with teachers and students, and promoting science, technology, engineering and mathematics. He next served in the Robotics Branch of the Astronaut Office. In October 2010, Melvin was named as associate administrator for the Office of Education.  As associate administrator, Melvin was responsible for the development and implementation of NASA's education programs that inspire interest in science and technology and raise public awareness about NASA goals and missions.  He retired from NASA in February 2014.

Melvin flew two missions on the Space Shuttle Atlantis: as a mission specialist on STS-122, and as mission specialist 1 on STS-129.

STS-122 (February 7 to February 20, 2008) was the 24th shuttle mission to visit the International Space Station. Mission highlight was the delivery and installation of the European Space Agency's Columbus (ISS module).  It took three spacewalks by crew members to prepare the Columbus Laboratory for its scientific work, and to replace an expended nitrogen tank on the Station's P-1 Truss.  STS-122 was also a crew replacement mission, delivering Expedition-16 flight engineer, ESA astronaut Léopold Eyharts, and returning home with Expedition-16 flight engineer, NASA astronaut Daniel Tani.  The STS-122 mission was accomplished in 12 days, 18 hours, 21 minutes and 40 seconds, and traveled 5,296,832 statute miles in 203 Earth orbits.

STS-129 (November 16 to November 29, 2009) was the 31st shuttle flight to the International Space Station.  During the mission, the crew delivered two ExPRESS Logistics Carriers (ELC racks) to the International Space Station, about 30,000 pounds of replacement parts for systems that provide power to the station, keep it from overheating, and maintain proper orientation in space.  The mission also featured three spacewalks.  The STS-129 mission was completed in 10 days, 19 hours, 16 minutes and 13 seconds, traveling 4.5 million miles in 171 orbits, and returned to Earth bringing back with them NASA Astronaut, Nicole Stott, following her tour of duty aboard the space station

Melvin has logged over 565 hours in space.

Personal life

Since retiring from NASA, Leland has given several STEM lectures of his experience in space to a wide range of audiences, as well as his football career in the NFL. He is described as being one of the most inspiring and influential NASA astronauts of all time. During his NASA career, while he was doing an underwater training, he sustained and partially recovered from a serious ear injury where his doctors stated the possibility of him being deaf, a malady which affects his left ear. Melvin has published two books; Chasing Space: An Astronaut's Story of Grit, Grace, and Second Chances and Chasing Space: Young Reader's Edition.
 
In his spare time he enjoys playing the piano, cooking, walking his two dogs Roux and Zoro, and is featured in several National Geographic Space documentaries and videos.

Gallery

See also
 List of African-American astronauts

References

External links

 Official website
 Spacefacts biography of Leland D. Melvin
 
 

1964 births
Living people
Writers from Lynchburg, Virginia
American football wide receivers
American astronauts
Detroit Lions players
Richmond Spiders football players
University of Virginia School of Engineering and Applied Science alumni
Deaf television personalities
American deaf people
Space Shuttle program astronauts
Players of American football from Virginia